Nadaan may refer to:

Nadaan (1943 film), a Bollywood film
Nadaan (1951 film), a Bollywood film
Nadaan (1971 film), a Bollywood drama starring Asha Parekh and Madan Puri.
Naadam, a traditional Mongolian festival

See also
 Dil-E-Nadaan, a 1982 Bollywood film
 Nadan (disambiguation)